Valmiera (see other names) is the largest city of the historical Vidzeme region, Latvia, with a total area of . As of 2002, Valmiera had a population of 27,323, and in 2020 – 24 879. It is a state city the seat of Valmiera Municipality.

Valmiera lies on both banks of the Gauja River.

Names and etymology
The name was derived from the Old German given name  or the Slavic name . The town may have been named after the kniaz of the Principality of Pskov Vladimir Mstislavich who became a vassal of Albert of Riga in 1212 and for a short time was a vogt of Tālava, Ydumea and Autīne. Another version, it may have been named after the King of Denmark Valdemar II who allied with the Livonian Brothers of the Sword in Livonian Crusade. In the second half of 13th century Livonian Order built a castle which they called  in German.

History

Valmiera and its surroundings have been one of the longest-inhabited regions of Latvia. Archeological evidence indicates the site was inhabited 9,000 years ago.
In 1224 after partition of Tālava trade roads along the Gauja river became property of Livonian Brothers of the Sword who erected a castle which is today known as Valmiera Castle. After the Battle of Saule in 1236 Valmiera Castle and nearby lands became the property of the newly established Livonian Order.

Valmiera was first mentioned as a town in a chronicle dating back to 1323. The actual founding of the town probably occurred at least 40 years earlier when the master of the Livonian Order Wilken von Endorp constructed a castle (Wolmar) and Catholic church on the banks of the river Gauja. Valmiera was a member of the Hanseatic League from the 14th–16th centuries. Involvement in the Hansa brought significant trade and movement into the town's life.
During the 14th–16th centuries several regional assemblies (landtags) were held in Valmiera. After the Livonian War in 1583 Valmiera was heavily devastated and was incorporated into the Duchy of Livonia as part of Wenden Voivodeship. After the Polish-Swedish war in 1622 Valmiera was managed by the Lord High Chancellor of Sweden Axel Oxenstierna.

During the Great Northern War Valmiera was again destroyed and burned down in 1702. It was further devastated by plague. During the first half of the 18th century Valmiera was on the decline.
In 1738 M.E. von Hallart opened the first seminary of the Moravian Church in Valmiera, a movement which played an important role in the history of Vidzeme.
In 1785 Valmiera became the centre of a district. The town saw rapid development in the 19th century. First it was stimulated by the building of the first bridge over the river Gauja in 1865. Later the building of the Riga-St.Petersburg railway line through the town in 1899 also played a major role. Many new factories were built in the town and new settlements were growing on both banks of the river Gauja. During 1911–12 a narrow gauge railway line Ainaži-Valmiera-Smiltene was built thus making Valmiera a major transport hub. In 1906 Municipal elections were held and Valmiera was one of the few towns in Latvia where Latvians won the majority of seats (18 of 24). As a result, local doctor Georgs Apinis was elected as mayor.
During the first quarter of the 20th century Valmiera also became a centre of culture and education as many schools were opened in the town. Among them were the Vidzeme teachers seminary, women gymnasium and merchant school.

During World War II, Valmiera was captured by troops of the German Army Group North on 4 July 1941 and placed under the administration of Reichskommissariat Ostland. In October 1941, 209 Jews from Valmiera and surrounding areas were murdered in local forests. The city was recaptured on 24 September 1944 by troops of the 3rd Baltic Front of the Red Army during the Riga Offensive. During the war almost all buildings at the center of Valmiera were destroyed.

The Cold War Liepas Air Base was located nearby.

Version 2.2 of the open source mapping application QGIS was named in honor of Valmiera.

Development

Valmiera's municipality has been involved a variety of projects to improve the quality of life in the region.

Projects implemented lately

 Reconstruction of Valmiera Pārgauja State Gymnasium
 Reconstruction of Valmiera Viestura Secondary school
 Dwelling house of various social groups
 Pedestrian track and watch terrace
 Construction of Māris Štrombergs BMX track “Valmiera”
 Construction of Valmiera Western Industrial highway
 Co-creation workshop “DARE”
 Reconstruction of Jānis Daliņš Stadium and construction of light athletics hall
 Valmiera Old Town development – Ziloņu Street
 Hybrid buses in the city
 Construction of woodchip boiler house

Ongoing projects

 Dormitory for pupils
 Valmiera Old Town development – Valmiera Palace cultural center
 Recreational and playground areas
 Two electric buses in the city
Construction of Valmiera Southern Industrial highway
 Career Development Support Program
 Renovation of Valmiera Drama Theater

Valmiera is an important industrial centre. The dominating economic branches in Valmiera are the food industry, fibreglass production, metalworking, wood processing and furniture production.

TOP 5 companies by turnover (Lursoft, 2018)

 “Valmieras Glass Group” JSC
 Cooperative “VAKS”
 "Valmieras piens" JSC
 “Dizozols”, Ltd
 Cooperative society of agricultural service dairy farmers “PIENA LOĢISTIKA”

Education 

A full cycle education is provided in Valmiera – starting from pre-schools until higher education and lifelong education institutions.
City provides full-range of education:
 8 Kindergartens
 2 Primary Schools
 4 Secondary Schools, including special education for disabled children
 2 State Gymnasiums
 Valmiera Music School
 Valmiera Sports School
 Valmiera Youth Centre "Vinda"
 Valmiera School of Design and Art
 Valmiera Vocational Education and Training School
 Vidzeme University of Applied Sciences
 Lifelong learning

In the academic year 2019/2020, 1625 children attended preschool educational institutions in Valmiera and 4084 students attended general education institutions.

The local government invests significantly into the development of the educational infrastructure. More than 50% of Valmiera annual budget is spent on a development of education in the city.

In Year 2016 Valmiera was included in UNESCO Global Network of Learning Cities (UNESCO GNLC). Its aim is to jointly seek for solutions to globalization, urbanization, demographics and other 21st century urban development challenges.

Culture 

Culture facilities in Valmiera
 Valmiera Drama Theatre
 Valmiera Culture centre
 Cinema "3D CINEMA" (kino "Gaisma")
 Concert hall "Valmiera"
 Valmiera Integrated library
 Valmiera Museum
 Art „Gallery Laipa”
 Gallery „Leduspagrabs”

Festivals and annual events in Valmiera
 International Winter Music Festival
 International competition for young pianists
 Valmiera Summer Theatre Festival
 Valmiera City Festival
 Simjūds’ Fair
 Summer concerts by the Valmiera Music School
 cinema festival "Kino Pedālis"
 Art month of Valmiera
 etc.

Sports 

In Valmiera, sports and an active lifestyle have historically been one of the city's main priorities. Over 40 sports organisations operate in Valmiera representing more than 30 different sports. The Valmiera Children's Sports School with over 1,200 pupils is the fourth biggest sports school in Latvia.

In the 1932 Summer Olympics in Los Angeles, Jānis Daliņš won a silver medal – the first ever Olympic medal won by Latvia. In honour of the athlete's achievements, in 1938 Valmiera Stadium was named after Jānis Daliņš. Many Olympians have come from Valmiera including BMX riders Ivo Lakučs, Edžus Treimanis, Rihards Veide and a two-time Olympic champion Māris Štrombergs. In turn, Jolanta Dukure, Arnis Rumbenieks and Aigars Fadējevs are race walkers, whose sporting roots can be found in Valmiera, as is the case with the initial sporting careers of bobsleigh racers Oskars Ķibermanis and Oskars Melbārdis.

Biggest sports teams:
 Valmiera Basketball Club – 2015/2016 Latvian Basketball League Champions
 Valmiera Floorball Club – 2017/2018 Floorball Latvia League runners-up
 Valmiera Football Club – finished 4th in the 2019 Latvian Higher Football League
 Valmiera Glass ViA – competing in Latvian-Estonian Basketball League

Extensive sports infrastructure is available in Valmiera, including Jānis Daliņš’ Stadium, Māris Štrombergs’ BMX "Valmiera" track, the Vidzeme Olympic Centre, "Krāces" rowing base, Valmiera Swimming Pool and outdoor running and Nordic walking tracks.

Annually, the biggest sports events held in the city are as follows:
 the State President's Athletics Competition
 Valmiera Marathon
 MTB Marathon
 “Rīga-Valmiera” Running and Walking Race
 Latvian Open Floorball Tournament
 the European Championship Qualification Games in Men's Handball

The biggest sport events to be held in Valmiera are:
 2011 FIBA Basketball World Championship U-19 Junior Sub-Group Games
 2014 Davis Cup Group Ties in Tennis
 2018 IFF World Championship Men's Floorball Qualification Tournament
 BMX European Championships 2019

Twin towns – sister cities

Valmiera is twinned with:

 Solna, Sweden (1991)
 Viljandi, Estonia (1992)
 Gütersloh (district), Germany (1994)
 Høje-Taastrup, Denmark (1995)
 Zduńska Wola, Poland (2001)
 Pskov, Russia (2002)
 Barysaw, Belarus (2010)
 Halle, Germany (2011)
 Siyazan, Azerbaijan (2014)
 Vallefoglia, Italy (2016)
 Cherkasy, Ukraine (2022)

Gallery

Notable people
 Velta Ruke-Dravina (1917–2003), Latvian-born Swedish linguist, folklorist, professor
 Dāvis Bertāns (1992–), basketball player in NBA
 Dairis Bertāns (1989–), former basketball player in NBA
 Arturs Maskats (1957–), composer.

See also
Valmiera Drama Theatre

References

 
Cities in Latvia
Republican cities of Latvia
Castles of the Teutonic Knights
Valmiera Municipality
Kreis Wolmar
Vidzeme